Spin drift can refer to:
 Spindrift, a song from Rush's 2007 album Snakes & Arrows
 The Magnus effect